The  is a hybrid diesel-electric multiple unit (DMU) train type operated by Kyushu Railway Company (JR Kyushu) in Japan since 14 March 2020. One two-car train was delivered in June 2018 for testing in preparation for full production and entry into revenue service.

Interior
The interior features LED lighting and four-language passenger information displays. Seating consists of a mix of longitudinal seating and seating bays.

Technical specifications
The car bodies are made out of stainless steel. The train is equipped with a storage battery, which can be charged with the regenerated power from braking. JR Kyushu reports that the hybrid system consumes 20% less fuel than the diesel-hydraulic KiHa 66 and 67 trains, which were envisaged to be replaced by the YC1 series.

History
The first set, a 2-car set, was delivered in June 2018, and is based at Sasebo depot. The set was used in a test run on the Nagasaki Main Line and Sasebo Line in March 2019. Revenue service began on 14 March 2020. Throughout 2020, twenty-four YC1 series cars were delivered from Kawasaki Heavy Industries' Hyogo plant.

Since 23 September 2022, a majority of Nagasaki Main Line local and rapid services have been operated using YC1 series trains.

References

External links

 JR Kyushu press release issued on 26 January 2018 

Hybrid multiple units of Japan
Kyushu Railway Company
Train-related introductions in 2018
Kawasaki multiple units